Cincin (which literally translates to 'ring cakes' in English) is a traditional kuih for the Bruneian Malay people in the states of Sabah, Malaysia as well in Brunei.

See also  
 Malaysian cuisine
 List of doughnut varieties
List of fried dough varieties

References

External links

Bruneian cuisine
Malaysian snack foods
Rice flour dishes